Dynamic Structures of the World is an American company with a history of steel fabrication dating back to 1927. They create amusement rides, theme park rides, observatory telescopes and other complex steel structures.

History
Dynamic Structures' history dates back to 1926, when Vancouver Art Metal was founded. The firm was renamed Coast Steel Fabricators Limited in 1952. In 1976, the firm was purchased by AGRA Inc., before being renamed AGRA Coast Limited in 1994. AGRA Inc. and its subsidiaries were acquired by British firm AMEC in 2001, with the company changing its name to AMEC Dynamic Structures. In 2007, AMEC sold the company to Empire Industries, who operate it as Dynamic Structures. In 2011, Dynamic Structures' amusement ride manufacturing was spun off into a sister company named Dynamic Attractions.

Astronomy projects

Dynamic Structures has been involved in the design and construction of most of the world's largest observatories. These include:

 Canada France Hawaii Telescope - Enclosure, Hawaii
 Isaac Newton Telescope - Enclosure, La Palma (Canary Islands)
 William Herschel Telescope - Enclosure, La Palma
 W.M. Keck Observatory, Phase 1 - Enclosure, Hawaii
 Owens Valley Radio Observatory - 3 Radio Telescope Support Structures, California
 Starfire Optical Range - Enclosure, New Mexico
 W.M. Keck Observatory, Phase 2 - Enclosure, Hawaii
 W.M. Keck Observatory, Phase 2 - Telescope Structure, Hawaii
 Subaru Telescope - Enclosure, Hawaii
 Gemini North an Gemini South - 2 Enclosures, Hawaii & Chil & Texas & Brzile
 Atacama Cosmology Telescope

Currently the company is busy with the design of what will be the largest telescope in the world, called the Thirty Meter Telescope

Steel structures
Other structures that Dynamic Structures have constructed include:
 Helix Pedestrian Bridge, Seattle, WA
 Vancouver Olympic Ski Jumps, Whistler, BC
 Richmond Olympic Oval, Richmond, BC
 Lougheed Skytrain Station, Burnaby, BC,

Dynamic Attractions 
Dynamic Attractions was a sister company to Dynamic Structures that was created in 2011 to serve the primary function of soliciting sales for theme park ride systems that would be manufactured by Dynamic Structures.

The firm entered the theme park ride system industry after one of the engineers on the Keck Observatory project asked the firm for assistance with steel fatigue on a roller coaster. Following the observatory project, this engineer secured a job at Walt Disney World in Florida.[12] [13] Due to the success of the project, Dynamic Structures gained additional contracts with Walt Disney Imagineering to manufacture the ride systems for Soarin' Over California and Test Track.[13] [14] This expanded the firm's presence in the theme park industry.[13]

In 2015, the company expanded their capabilities to include complete design and installation services for all elements of the attraction.  Using the marketing of "Ride – Show – Integration," this focus led to the opening of a research and development facility called the "Attraction Development Center" in Orlando, FL. Through this facility, the company can do large-scale mock-ups and is staffed for design and development of ideas as well as ride systems.

In July 2017, the Dynamic Attractions company combined with all the "ride system" elements of the Dynamic Structures company.  The new Dynamic Attractions organization includes the Ride Development Center (Formerly Dynamic Structures offices and facility) in Port Coquitlam, Canada, as well as the Attraction Development Center in Orlando, Florida. (Dynamic Structures still exists as a company whose focus includes specialty fabrication and telescopes.)

Projects

List of roller coasters

Gallery

References

Amusement ride manufacturers
Manufacturing companies established in 1926
Roller coaster manufacturers
Steel companies of Canada
1926 establishments in British Columbia